The  2011 Honda Indy 200 presented by Westfield Insurance was the fifth running of the Honda 200 and the twelfth round of the 2011 IndyCar Series season. It took place on Sunday, August 7, 2011. The race contested over 85 laps at the  Mid-Ohio Sports Car Course in Lexington, Ohio.

Honda Indy 200
Indy 200 at Mid-Ohio
Honda Indy 200
Honda Indy 200